The Human Bean is an American national coffee company and coffeehouse chain based in Medford, Oregon. The Human Bean has 149 drive-through coffee locations in 21 U.S. states. The drive through espresso brand started franchising in 2002.

History 
In 1998, The Human Bean opened its first store in Ashland, Oregon. In early-2002, the company began franchising their brand throughout southern Oregon and nationwide.

The Human Bean has 149 locations. The franchise is located in 21 U.S. states including Arizona, California, Colorado, Florida, Georgia, Idaho, Illinois, Indiana, Kentucky, Missouri, Nevada, New Mexico, North Carolina, New Mexico, Ohio, Oregon, South Carolina, Texas, Washington, Wyoming, and West Virginia.

While most locations are drive-through only, there are a few locations that offer indoor seating in addition to the drive through.

The chain sponsors women's and men's health initiatives. Its chief operating officer is Scott Anderson.

Awards and recognition
In January 2021, The Human Bean was named one of the Top 100 of Entrepreneur ’s Franchise 500.

In February 2021, Scott Anderson, COO of Nation's Restaurant News Most Influential Restaurant Executives in the Country.  

In July 2021, The Human Bean was named one of Nation's Restaurant News Top 25 Fastest Growing Restaurant Chains in America by Nation's Restaurant News.

References

External links 
 

Companies based in Ashland, Oregon
Restaurants established in 1998
Privately held companies based in Oregon
1998 establishments in Oregon
Coffeehouses and cafés in the United States
Fast-food chains of the United States